Stanton is an unincorporated community in southern Franklin County, Missouri, United States. It lies on Interstate 44 at the junction with Missouri Supplemental Route W, which provides access to Meramec Caverns, located approximately two miles southeast along the Meramec River.

A post office called Stanton has been in operation since 1857. The community took its name from the nearby Stanton copper mines.

Demographics

References

Unincorporated communities in Franklin County, Missouri
Unincorporated communities in Missouri
1857 establishments in Missouri

ar:ستانتون